Nimbra is one of thirteen parishes in Quirós, a municipality within the province and autonomous community of Asturias, in coastal northern Spain. 

The parish church is dedicated to St. Vincent. Its villages include:

 L'Aguadina 
 Cabanieḷḷas 
 Rodiles 
 Ronderos 
 San Vicente de Nimbra 
 Viḷḷaxime 
 Viḷḷamarcel 
 Viḷḷasante

References

Parishes in Quirós